The following is an incomplete list of starting quarterbacks for the Toronto Argonauts of the Canadian Football League that have started a regular season game for the team. This list includes postseason appearances since 1990, but does not include preseason games. They are listed in order of most starts with any tiebreaker being the date of each player's first start at quarterback for the Argonauts.

Starting quarterbacks by season
Where known, the number of games they started during the season is listed to the right:

 * - Indicates that the number of starts is not known for that year for each quarterback

References
 Argonauts Game Notes
 CFLapedia
 CFLDB
 Stats Crew

St
Toronto Argonauts
Starting quarterbacks